Etc. or et cetera, a Latin expression meaning "and the other things" or "and the rest".

ETC or etc may also refer to:

Companies and organizations
 ETC (Chilean TV channel), a Chilean cable television channel
 ETC (Philippine TV channel), a Philippine television network
 Zee ETC Bollywood, an Indian television channel
 Ethiopian Telecommunications Corporation, a telecommunications provider
 ETC Group (eco-justice), an American appropriate-technology organization
 Electric Telegraph Company, British Victorian company and ancestor of British Telecom
 European Technical Center, of the US National Security Agency
 European Travel Commission, a tourism agency
 Experimental Theatre Club, at University of Oxford, England

Science and technology
 Electron transport chain, in molecular biology
 Electronic throttle control, an automobile technology
 Electronic toll collection
 Electrothermal-chemical technology, in artillery
 Encyclopedia of Triangle Centers, an online list of points of a triangle
 Ericsson Texture Compression, an image compression algorithm
 /etc, a directory in Unix-like systems, see Unix file system#Conventional directory layout
 Extraterrestrial technological civilization

Finance
 Ethereum Classic cryptocurrency, ticker symbol
 Equipment trust certificate, a financial security
 Estimate to complete, in earned value management
 Exchange-traded commodity or currency or certificate; see Exchange-traded fund

Other uses
 Etc (band), a Czech rock band
 ETC: A Review of General Semantics, a scholarly journal
 Cadillac ETC, an automobile
 Etc, a special time zone area, see Tz database#Area
 Expressive therapies continuum, in art therapy

See also 
 ETCS, the signalling and control component of the European Rail Traffic Management System
 Etcetera (disambiguation)